The Churches of Peace in Jawor and Świdnica in Silesia were named after the Peace of Westphalia of 1648.

It permitted the Lutherans of Silesia to build three churches from wood, loam and straw outside the city walls, without steeples and church bells. The construction time was limited to one year. The third Peace church, erected in Głogów (then German ), burned down in 1758.

Since 2001, the two remaining churches are listed as UNESCO World Heritage Sites.

History 
Despite the physical and political constraints, three of the churches became the biggest timber-framed religious buildings in Europe due to pioneering constructional and architectural solutions.

It was constructed by architect Albrecht von Saebisch (1610–1688) from Wroclaw (then German Breslau) and was finished a year later in 1655. The 200 paintings inside by were done by Georg Flegel in 1671–1681. The altar, by Martin Schneider, dates to 1672, the original organ of J. Hoferichter from Legnica (then German Liegnitz) of 1664 was replaced in 1855–1856 by Adolf Alexander Lummert.

By that time, the town had been part of the majority Protestant Kingdom of Prussia for about a century. Another 100 years later, in 1945, the town became part of Poland, as a result of the Potsdam Agreement. Although most of the Protestant churches in the German provinces taken over by Poland in 1945 became Catholic, the two Peace Churches still serve their Lutheran parishes.

The similar church, erected in Głogów (then German Glogau) burned down in 1758, but the one in Świdnica, dedicated to the Holy Trinity, survived like the one in Jawor. Both were restored by a Polish–German cooperation, and recognized by UNESCO in 2001.

Gallery

Świdnica

Jawor

Surroundings 
 Gola Dzierżoniowska Castle
 Medieval town of Niemcza
 Cistercian monastery at Henryków
 Wojsławice Arboretum

Bibliography 
 Worthmann, Ludwig, Führer durch die Friedenskirche zu Schweidnitz. Breslau 1929.
 Kalinowski, Konstanty, Barock in Schlesien. München 1990. .
 Gruk, Wojciech, Silesian Churches of Peace and the Royal Hungarian Articular Churches. Possible Legal and Architectural Relations. In: Protestantischer Kirchenbau der Frühen Neuzeit in Europa. Grundlagen und neue Forschungskonzepte. — Protestant Church Architecture in Early Modern Europe. Fundamentals and New Research Approaches. Regensburg 2015, p. 333-343. .

External links 

 Church Of Peace in Jawor – photo gallery
 Church of Peace in Świdnica 

Christianity in the Holy Roman Empire
Habsburg Silesia
Christianity in Prussia
Lutheran churches in Poland
Jawor
Buildings and structures in Świdnica
17th-century Lutheran churches in Germany
Churches in Lower Silesian Voivodeship
World Heritage Sites in Poland